Nicolas de Crucibus or Nicolò delle Croci (died 1473) was a Roman Catholic prelate who served as Bishop of Hvar (1463–1473) 
and Bishop of Chioggia (1457–1463).

Biography
On 21 October 1457, Nicolas de Crucibus was appointed Bishop of Chioggia by Pope Callixtus III.
On 10 February 1463, he was appointed Bishop of Hvar in Dalmatia Pope Pius II. 
He served as Bishop of Hvar until his death in 1473.

While bishop, he was the principal co-consecrator of Francesco Barozzi (bishop), Bishop of Treviso (1466).

References 

15th-century Roman Catholic bishops in the Republic of Venice
Bishops appointed by Pope Callixtus III
Bishops appointed by Pope Pius II
1473 deaths